Big Walter Horton with Carey Bell is an album by the American blues musicians Big Walter Horton and Carey Bell, recorded in Chicago in 1972 and released by the Alligator label.

Reception

Allmusic reviewer Bill Dahl stated "The teacher/pupil angle might be a bit unwieldy here -- Bell was already a formidable harpist in his own right by 1972, when Horton made this album -- but there's no denying that a stylistic bond existed between the two. A highly showcase for the often recalcitrant harp master, and only his second domestic set as a leader".

Track listing
All compositions by Big Walter Horton except where noted
 "Have a Good Time" − 3:48
 "Christine" − 4:03
 "Lovin' My Baby" − 2:50
 "Little Boy Blue" − 3:14
 "Can't Hold Out Much Longer" − 2:52
 "Under the Sun" − 3:51
 "Tell Me Baby" − 3:15
 "Have Mercy" − 3:45
 "That Ain't It" (James A. Lane) − 2:41
 "Temptation" − 3:43
 "Trouble in Mind" (Richard M. Jones) − 4:38

Personnel
Big Walter Horton − harmonica, vocals
Carey Bell − second harmonica, bass
Eddie Taylor − guitar
Joe Harper − bass
Frank Swan – drums

References

Alligator Records albums
1972 albums
Big Walter Horton albums
Carey Bell albums